Castiarina aglaia is a species of beetle of the genus Castiarina and the family Buprestidae. It was scientifically documented by Barker in 1987.

References

aglaia
Beetles described in 1987